Pierre Humbert may refer to:
Pierre Humbert (architect) (1848–?), French architect
Pierre Humbert (mathematician) (1891–1953), French mathematician